Gail Anne Pacheco is a New Zealand economics academic. She is currently a full professor at the Auckland University of Technology.

Academic career

After a 2007 PhD at titled  'Minimum wage in New Zealand : an empirical enquiry'  at the University of Auckland, she moved to the Auckland University of Technology, rising to full professor.

Pacheco's work on family incomes and gender pay has been widely reported on.

Selected works 
 Knechel, W. Robert, Vic Naiker, and Gail Pacheco. "Does auditor industry specialization matter? Evidence from market reaction to auditor switches." Auditing: A Journal of Practice & Theory 26, no. 1 (2007): 19–45.
 Van Der Westhuizen, De Wet, Gail Pacheco, and Don J. Webber. "Culture, participative decision making and job satisfaction." The International Journal of Human Resource Management 23, no. 13 (2012): 2661–2679.
 Fargher, Scott, Stefan Kesting, Thomas Lange, and Gail Pacheco. "Cultural heritage and job satisfaction in Eastern and Western Europe." International Journal of Manpower 29, no. 7 (2008): 630–650.
Pacheco, Gail, Li, Chao and Cochrane, Bill, "Empirical evidence of the gender pay gap in New Zealand." Ministry for Women (2017).
Dr Isabelle Sin, Dr Kabir Dasgupta and Professor Gail Pacheco "Parenthood and labour market outcomes"  Ministry for Women (2018).

References

External links
 

Living people
Year of birth missing (living people)
New Zealand women academics
New Zealand economists
University of Auckland alumni
Academic staff of the Auckland University of Technology